iGold Technologies is a Software and Game Development company.
They develop games for Android, iOS, Windows Phone, Facebook and PC.

Games released by iGold Technologies

Android Platform
iGold's  Android games that crossed Million Downloads.

Recent Android games released by iGold Technologies.

iOS Platform
List of iOS games released by iGold Technologies.

Recent iOS games released by iGold Technologies.

Windows Phone Platform
List of Windows Phone games released by iGold Technologies

PC Games
List of PC Games released by iGold Technologies.

Facebook Game

References

External links

Video game development companies